Frank Fraser Tims (February 8, 18561949) was a Canadian politician. He served on the North-West Legislative Assembly for Victoria from 1894 to 1898.

Early life 
Frank Fraser Tims was born on February 8, 1856, in Berlin, Ontario to Frank D. Tims, the Deputy Provincial Auditor for the Province of Quebec and Caroline Dudley Fraser, one of 13 children. Tims moved to Manitoba in 1882, and Alberta in 1887. Tims was the first person to erect a building in Regina, a frame store, which he expanded to swift current.

Political life 
Tims contested the 1894 North-West Territories general election in the Victoria electoral district, winning the seat by acclamation. Tims was defeated in the following 1898 North-West Territories general election by Jack Shera, collecting 221 votes to Shera's 242.

Tims also served on the Fort Saskatchewan School Board.

Later life 
Tims moved from Fort Saskatchewan to Edmonton and began working in real estate and insurance.

References 

1856 births
1949 deaths
Members of the Legislative Assembly of the Northwest Territories